Dr. B. R. Ambedkar University, Srikakulam is a state university located in Etcherla, Srikakulam district, Andhra Pradesh, India. It was established in 2008 by the Government of Andhra Pradesh. The university is named after B. R. Ambedkar.

History
The Dr. B.R. Ambedkar University, Srikakulam was established by the Government of Andhra Pradesh in 2008. The university was given control of the Andhra University campus in Etcherla and all its affiliated colleges in Srikakulam. The first Vice-Chancellor (VC) was S.V. Sudhakar, followed by H. Lajipathi Rai in 2013. 	Nimma Venkata Rao was appointed VC in January 2021.

References

External links

State universities in Andhra Pradesh
Educational institutions established in 2008
2008 establishments in Andhra Pradesh
Universities and colleges in Srikakulam district
Uttarandhra